The 2011 Richmond Raiders season was the second season as a professional indoor football franchise and their first in the Southern Indoor Football League (SIFL). One of 16 teams competing in the SIFL for the 2011 season.

Chris Simpson became the head coach of the Raiders for the 2011 season, coming over from the defunct Baltimore Mariners.  Simpson didn't make it to opening day, though, as he "relocated to Texas to pursue family business opportunities".  He was replaced by James Fuller, who was the interim head coach for the AFL Dallas Vigilantes in 2010.

Former Richmond Revolution head coach Steve Criswell signed with the Raiders as a senior consultant for the 2011 season.  Criswell brought several former Revolution players along, including QB Bryan Randall and DL Lawrence Lewis.

The Raiders earned a 6-6 record, placing 1st in the Mid-Atlantic division, but due to league playoff qualifying rules, did not make the playoffs, as 4 other Eastern Conference teams had a better record.

Schedule
Key:

Preseason

Regular season

Roster

Division Standings

 Green indicates clinched playoff berth
 Purple indicates division champion
 Grey indicates best league record
 * = Failed to make the playoffs despite winning division
 ** = Folded five games into their season.
 *** = Suspended operations prior to the season due to lack of Worker's Compensation Insurance

References

External links
 2012 stats

Richmond Raiders
Richmond Raiders
Richmond Raiders